The Camperdown Chronicle is the local newspaper of the Australian town of Camperdown, Victoria. The Chronicle was first printed on 1 October 1874 by proprietor and editor, James Allen. Published three times a week it covers news from the Western District of Victoria as well as Geelong and Melbourne.

References

External links 

Digitised World War I Victorian newspapers from the State Library of Victoria

Newspapers published in Victoria (Australia)
Camperdown, Victoria
Newspapers on Trove